Ryszard Kierczyński (3 March 1902 (estimated) - 22 December 1971) was a Polish stage and film actor. He was the son of Tomasz Kieliszczyk, a labourer, and his wife Bronisława. In 1919, he graduated from high school in Warsaw and went on to study sociology at the Free Polish University. In 1924, he joined Juliusz Osterwa's Theatre Reduta and remained there until 1926. From 1926 to 1927, he belonged to the theatre group based in Łódź.

From September 1927, he began to use the name Kierczyński.

During the Second World War, he took an active part in the underground movement.

Death
Kieliszczyk died on 22 July 1971 in Warsaw, aged 69.

References

External links
 "Ryszard Kierczyński", Filmweb 

1900s births
1971 deaths
20th-century Polish male actors
Polish male film actors
Polish male stage actors
Polish male television actors